Hugh McCulloch House is a historic home located at Fort Wayne, Indiana. It was built in 1843, and is a two-story, three bay by four bay, Greek Revival style painted brick building. It features a projecting front portico supported by four Doric order columns.  An Italianate style addition was erected in 1862.  It was built by U.S. statesman and United States Secretary of the Treasury Hugh McCulloch (1808-1895), and remained in the family until 1887.  The house was purchased in 1892 by the Fort Wayne College of Medicine, who expanded and remodeled the house.  It was sold in 1906 to the Turnverein Verewoerts, or Turners, who owned the building until 1966.

It was listed on the National Register of Historic Places in 1980.

References

Houses on the National Register of Historic Places in Indiana
Houses completed in 1843
Italianate architecture in Indiana
Greek Revival houses in Indiana
National Register of Historic Places in Fort Wayne, Indiana
Houses in Fort Wayne, Indiana